Heri Hjalt Mohr (born 13 May 1997) is a Faroese football player. He plays for HB.

International career
He was first called up to the Faroe Islands national football team in September 2020, but did not play.

He made his debut on 1 September 2021 in a World Cup qualifier against Israel, a 0–4 home loss. He substituted Gunnar Vatnhamar in the 76th minute.

References

External links
 
 

1997 births
Living people
Faroese footballers
Faroe Islands youth international footballers
Faroe Islands international footballers
Association football defenders
Havnar Bóltfelag players
Tvøroyrar Bóltfelag players
Argja Bóltfelag players
Faroe Islands Premier League players